YSNP can refer to:
Yellowstone National Park, in Wyoming, United States.
Yushan National Park in Taiwan
"You Shall Not Pass", a famous quote from Gandalf during his battle with a balrog in The Lord of the Rings